Bajalta railway station is a small railway station in Jammu district, Jammu and Kashmir. Its code is BLA. It serves Baljata city. The station consists of 2 platforms. The platform is not well sheltered, and lacks many facilities including water and sanitation.

See also

 Jammu–Baramulla line
 Northern Railways
 List of railway stations in Jammu and Kashmir

References

External links
  Indian Railways

Railway stations in Jammu district
Firozpur railway division